Carroll County High School is located in Carroll County, Virginia, just outside the Hillsville town limits.  Carroll County High School is a four-year, public, comprehensive high school with a full range of curriculum offerings in academic and vocational subjects. The 2009 enrollment of Carroll County High School was 1158 students.

References

External links
 CCHS Official Site
 Carroll County Public Schools
 Chillsnet - Official Site for Carroll County & Hillsville, VA

Public high schools in Virginia
Educational institutions established in 1969
Schools in Carroll County, Virginia
1969 establishments in Virginia